Apokalips X is a 2014 Malaysian post-apocalyptic action film directed and written by Mamat Khalid.

Cast
 Farid Kamil as X
 Jehan Miskin as Kala
 Peter Davis as Sri Gala
 Zoie Tam as Kulat
 Miera Leyana as Qi Qi
 Iqram Dinzly as Razor

References

External links
 

2014 films
2014 science fiction action films
Malay-language films
2014 multilingual films
Post-apocalyptic films
Films directed by Mamat Khalid
Films with screenplays by Mamat Khalid
Tayangan Unggul films
Films produced by Gayatri Su-Lin Pillai
Malaysian science fiction action films
2010s English-language films
Malaysian multilingual films